The FL-boat (Fernlenkboot, literally "remote controlled boat") was a weapon used by the Imperial German Navy during World War I. It was a remote-controlled motorboat, 17 m long, carrying  of explosives, which was intended to be steered directly at its targets - initially the Royal Navy monitors operating off the coast of Flanders.

FL-boats were constructed by Siemens-Schuckertwerke. They were driven by internal combustion engines and controlled remotely from a shore station through spooled wire unwound behind the boat. An aircraft could be used to signal directions to the shore station by radio. The commands available to the boat operator were:

 System test
 Engine start, engine stop
 Set Rudder position
 Turn on a light, to enable the boat to be tracked at night
 Detonate the warhead, to prevent capture of the boat if it missed its target

Planned developments were to use a control station carried on a ship, in an airship or use a radio-control system.

On 1 March 1917 an FL-boat hit the Nieuwpoort mole and on 28 October 1917 one hit the Royal Navy monitor HMS Erebus.

See also 
 MT explosive motorboat, similar Italian manned assault boats of World War II

References

World War I naval ships of Germany
Unmanned surface vehicles